Brita dance or Vrita dance is a traditional folk dance from West Bengal, India. It is performed by the women in rural areas to ask the deity to bless them with children and to show gratitude for helping them recover from contagious diseases like chicken pox. The folk dance is performed on the temple premises, both before and after their wishes are fulfilled.

References 

Bengali culture
Dances of India
Folk dances of West Bengal